Swing Low Sweet Spiritual is an album by American free jazz saxophonist Albert Ayler recorded in New York City at the same session that produced Spirits in 1964 and intended for release on the Danish Debut label but first released in 1981 on the Dutch Osmosis label then re-released on CD with bonus tracks on the Black Lion label as Goin' Home.

Reception

The Allmusic review by Scott Yanow stated: "Ayler works well with his backup group (pianist Call Cobbs, bassist Henry Grimes, and drummer Sunny Murray) and creates very emotional music (really hanging onto the themes)". Al Campbell commented: "These traditional compositions are treated with reverence and a lack of improvisation, played in a quietly passionate but respectful manner. They reveal a sensitivity that was obscured with the emotionally charged tenor screeching of the Ayler originals that were also recorded at this session".

Track listing
 "Goin' Home" (Traditional) - 4:26
 "Ol' Man River" [take 2] (Oscar Hammerstein II, Jerome Kern) - 5:25
 "Down by the Riverside" [take 6] (Traditional) - 4:39
 "Swing Low, Sweet Chariot" [take 3] (Traditional)  - 4:30
 "Deep River" (Traditional) - 4:15
 "When the Saints Go Marching In" (Traditional) - 4:12
 "Nobody Knows the Trouble I've Seen" (Traditional) - 4:44
 "Ol' Man River" [take 1] (Hammerstein, Kern) - 3:58 Additional track on Goin Home CD release   
 "Swing Low, Sweet Chariot" [take 1] (Traditional) - 4:49
 "Down by the Riverside" [take 5] (Traditional) - 4:28

Personnel
Albert Ayler - tenor saxophone, soprano saxophone
Call Cobbs - piano
Henry Grimes - bass (tracks 2-10) 
Sunny Murray - drums (tracks 2-10)

References

1971 albums
Albert Ayler albums
Black Lion Records albums